Myrcia grandiflora is a species of plant in the family Myrtaceae. It is endemic to Brazil.

References

Endemic flora of Brazil
grandiflora
Vulnerable plants
Taxonomy articles created by Polbot